Augustus Franciscus Joseph De Boodt (Nieuwmunster, December 30, 1895, Turnhout, March 21, 1986) was from 1936 to 1968, senator District Mechelen – Turnhout. He was a member of the CVP (now CD&V). He was Councilor Turnhout from 1936 to 1946. In 1950, he was appointed Minister of Reconstruction by Joseph Pholien.

Biography

Early life and career 
De Boodt did his secondary school studies at the Episcopal College of Menin and was promoted to an agricultural engineer (1921) to the University of Leuven. He was an active member and senior of the UCL student club Moeder Meense 

De Boodt married Pauline Vermeylen and became the father of five children. He went to work for the Farmers and settled in Turnhout, he was the promoter of agricultural and livestock improvements in De Kempen, where he resided with his family at domain Zwart Goor 1 – 2330 Merksplas, a townhouse in Turnhout's town square during the week and an appartement in Brussels for his political functions. He founded several agricultural associations.

From 1936 to 1946, he was a Councilor for Turnhout.

Senator (1936–1968) 
In 1936, he was elected senator for the Catholic District Mechelen – Turnhout and held this office until 1968.
In parliament, he participated in the work of the Centre Harmel.

Minister (1950–1952) 
In 1950, he was Minister of Reconstruction in the homogeneous CVP – Government Joseph Pholien (August 1950 – January 1952), which until came about after the settlement of the Royal Question. He came into the government strengthen the group of more Flemish Sentient politicians (André Dequae, Geeraard Van Den Daele, Paul Willem Segers, Albert Coppé), to the great displeasure To meet the Flemish side of such settlement.

These Ministers, a few days after their appointment, participated in the annual IJzerbedevaart. On the eve of that pilgrimage wrote De Boodt the sum of 1 million francs in his budget for reconstruction of the dynamited tower, today, the IJzertoren is still a symbol of Flemish nationalism and a symbol to remember the cruelties that happen during wars, thus a symbol of peace.

De Boodt's name is engraved on the tower, for his national contributions and bringing his country justice during a time of chaos. He is Freeman of Tessenderlo, a descendant of Anselmus de Boodt.

Honours 
 : Minister of Reconstruction, by Royal Decree.
 : Commander in the Order of Leopold.
 : Knight Grand Cross in the Order of the Crown.
 : Honorary citizen of Tessenderlo

References

Sources 
 Herman Todts,  August De Boodt The 25-year senator , in: The Standard, December 6, 1961.
 Herman Todts,  Senator De Boodt was 70 years , in: The Standard, January 3, 1966.
 Paul VAN MOLLE,  The Belgian Parliament, 1894-1972 , Antwerp, 1972.
 Jean-Marie Lermyte others,  August De Boodt , in: New Encyclopedia of the Flemish Movement, Tielt, 1998.
 Wouter Beke,  The Soul of a column: the Christian People's Party 1945-1968 , Leuven, 2005.

External links 
 August De Boodt in ODIS - Online Database for Intermediary Structures 

Belgian politicians
1895 births
1986 deaths